John Hoke III is the chief design officer of Nike Inc. He leads the company's design team which includes over 1,000 product and industrial designers, graphic and fashion designers, as well as architects, interface, and digital content designers.

Early life and education 
Hoke grew up outside of Providence, Rhode Island. As a child, he was athletic and enjoyed running in the Nike waffle trainer shoe. After he had worn out a pair, he would slice the shoe in half to examine how it was made. 

One summer, Hoke was floating on a raft in a pool, when he wondered what would happen if he could shrink the raft and put it under his foot to cushion and help with shock absorption and spring. He made sketches of his idea and was encouraged by his father, an engineer, to send it to Nike co-founder and president Phil Knight. To his surprise, Knight wrote back and sent him a pair of trainers and a t-shirt, encouraging Hoke to work for Nike when he was older. At the time, Hoke was 12 years old.

Hoke has spoken openly about growing up with dyslexia, and has said that he considers drawing to be his first language. With support from his parents, he worked with a specialist from Brown University and realized that his dyslexia could be an advantage, and that his strengths were in "art, design, and creativity".

Hoke received an undergraduate degree in architecture (B.Arch) from Pennsylvania State University in 1988, followed by a Master of Architecture (M.Arch) from the University of Pennsylvania, and a Stanford University MBA.

Work and career 
Early in his career, Hoke worked as a model-maker for architect Michael Graves, who, until he passed away in 2015, was a mentor of Hoke's. He was hired by Nike in 1992 as a senior designer in environmental design.

Collaborations 

At Nike, he collaborated with Serena Williams for almost 20 years. Speaking about Williams for an article in the New York Times by fashion critic Vanessa Friedman, he said "on a scale of 1 to 10 of involvement with her clothes, she is a 10." Under his leadership, Nike has also worked with designers such as Virgil Abloh, Max Lamb, and Sebastian Wrong, the architect Greg Lynn, artists including Tom Sachs and Travis Scott, and brands such as Jacquemus, Comme des Garçons, and Louis Vuitton.

The largest building on Nike's Portland campus is the one million square foot Serena Williams Building which features many references to the athlete's career and her long collaboration with Nike. It was designed by Skylab Architecture, and according to Hoke, involved important creative input from Williams herself. Hoke's house, also designed in collaboration with Skylab Architecture, appears in the Twilight film franchise.

Sustainability at Nike 
In an interview with Monocle magazine, Hoke said: "Regeneration is going to be a huge part of design’s future, that means the constant reimagining of matter. How this shoe becomes a basketball, becomes a shirt, becomes a bag and goes back to being a shoe. We have that power, that control, as designers.” Hoke has also spoken about Nike's "Move To Zero" design philosophy and the role that circular design, sustainability, and carbon footprint reduction will play in its design practice, and has stated that "[o]ur role as a brand is to be very thoughtful about sport and our planet." However, the "Move To Zero" initiative has been criticised for falling short of its stated goals.

In 2023, Nike published a book titled "No Finish Line" that sets out the company's design vision for the future. The forward was written by Hoke, and it includes essays and writing by Geoff Manaugh and Sam Grawe.

Board membership 
He is a member of the Herman Miller Inc. board of directors. He is a trustee at Pacific Northwest College of Art. He is a permanent design fellow at Pennsylvania State University. Hoke also served as national trustee of the Cooper Hewitt, Smithsonian Design Museum.

Awards and honours 
 2019 Pinnacle Award, International Dyslexia Association
 2023 Distinguished Alumni Award, Pennsylvania State University

Personal life 
Hoke lives with his wife and three sons in Portland, Oregon.

Publications 
 The Surreal Visions of Hernán Díaz Alonso/HDA-X with a foreword by John Hoke III, 
 HAY. Rolf and Mette Hay, edited by Kelsey Keith, with a foreword by John Hoke III, 
 Grawe, Sam (2020). Nike: better is temporary. Phaidon, London. . 
 After all, there is No Finish Line. (2023) Actual Source, Provo.

Notes

References

External links 
 Better is Temporary Virtual Weitzman School Talk moderated by Sarah Rottenberg (interview)
 Design in Dialogue #107 with Glenn Adamson Friedman Benda Gallery (interview)
 John Hoke on Technology as a Co-Conspirator in Creativity. Time Sensitive Ep. 61 (interview)
 John Hoke: Movers Shakers Designers Makers Ep. 7 (interview)
 The Nature of Motion exhibition at Milan Design Week 2016 (interview)
 How to Prioritise Sustainability, Hoke and Samuel Ross at the Copenhagen Fashion Summit (panel discussion)
 How Nike Designs for an N.B.A. Athlete (2017-10-16) The New York Times. (short film)
 How Nike Won the Cultural Marathon. Friedman, Vanessa (2022-06-15).The New York Times. . Retrieved 2022-09-17.
 John Hoke Biography on Forum, Fashion, Tech.

People with dyslexia
Living people
Pennsylvania State University alumni
University of Pennsylvania alumni
Stanford University alumni
Product designers
Industrial designers
Industrial design
American fashion designers
American architects
Year of birth missing (living people)